In many extant t'ai chi classic writings the dependence of t'ai chi ch'uan on Chinese philosophy is acknowledged.  T'ai chi teachers have historically asserted that the principles of tai chi chuan practice can be applied to a student's lifestyle.

'T'ai chi ch'uan' is often translated supreme ultimate pugilism or boundless fist.  This refers to the ancient Chinese martial art.  However, in terms of philosophy t'ai chi has a wider meaning.  The concept of t'ai chi or the Supreme Ultimate is used in various Chinese philosophical schools, usually to represent the contrast in opposing categories, or the interplay of those categories usually termed yin and yang.  These abstract terms represent the relationships used to describe perceived opposites in the phenomenal world: full and empty, movement and stillness, soft and hard, light and dark, hot and cold, et cetera. This scheme has had a lasting influence in traditional Chinese culture, shaping theory in schools as diverse as Confucianism, Taoism, Legalism and, to a lesser extent, Chan Buddhism, as well as traditional Chinese medicine and feng shui. T'ai chi ch'uan, a relatively recent development compared to the aforementioned schools was even named by some of its earliest known exponents after the t'ai chi concept, possibly as late as the mid-nineteenth century.

In the "Forty Chapter" t'ai chi classic text supplied by Yang Pan-hou to Wu Ch'uan-yu in the late nineteenth century, there are the following references to the philosophy of t'ai chi ch'uan as applied to  a practitioner's lifestyle:

14. An Explanation of the Spiritual and Martial in Tai Chi

The spiritual is the essence, the martial is the application. Spiritual development in the realm of martial arts is applied through the ching (metabolic energy), ch'i (breath energy) and shen (spiritual energy) - the practise of physical culture. When the martial is matched with the spiritual and it is experienced in the body and mind, this then is the practise of martial arts. With the spiritual and martial we must speak of "firing time," for their development unfolds according to the proper sequence. This is the root of physical culture. Therefore, the practise of the martial arts in a spiritual way is soft-style exercise, the sinew power of ching, ch'i and shen. When the martial arts are practical in an exclusively martial way, this is hard style, or simply brute force. The spiritual without martial training is essence without application; the martial without spiritual accompaniment is application without essence. A lone pole cannot stand, a single palm cannot clap. This is not only true of physical culture and martial arts, but all things are subject to this principle. The spiritual is internal principle; the martial is external skill. External skill without internal principle is simply physical ferocity. This is a far cry from the original nature of the art, and by bullying an opponent one eventually invites disaster. To understand the internal principles without the external skill is simply an armchair art. Without knowing the applications, one will be lost in an actual confrontation. When it comes to applying this art, one cannot afford to ignore the significance of the two words: spiritual and martial.

19. An Explanation of the Three Levels of the Spiritual and Martial in Tai Chi

Without self-cultivation, there would be no means of realising the Tao. Nevertheless, the methods of practise can be divided into three levels. The term level means attainment. The highest level is the great attainment; the lowest level is the lesser attainment; the middle level is the attainment of sincerity. Although the methods are divided into three levels of practise, the attainment is one. The spiritual is cultivated internally and the martial externally; physical culture is internal and martial arts external. Those whose practise is successful both internally and externally reach the highest level of attainment. Those who master the martial arts through the spiritual aspect of physical culture, and those who master the spiritual aspect of physical culture through the martial arts attain the middle level. However, those who know only physical culture but not the martial arts, or those who know only the martial arts without physical culture represent the lowest levels of attainment.

20. An Explanation of the Martial Aspect of T’ai Chi

As a martial art, T’ai Chi is externally a soft exercise, but internally hard, even as it seeks softness. If we are externally soft, after a long time we will naturally develop internal hardness. It’s not that we consciously cultivate hardness, for in reality our mind is on softness. What is difficult is to remain internally reserved, to possess hardness without expressing it, always externally meeting the opponent with softness. Meeting hardness with softness causes the opponent’s hardness to be transformed and disappear into nothingness. How can we acquire this skill? When we have mastered sticking, adhering, connecting and following, we will naturally progress from conscious movement to interpreting energy and finally spiritual illumination and the realm of absolute transcendence. If our skill has not reached absolute transcendence, how could we manifest the miracle of four ounces moving a thousand pounds? It is simply a matter of “understanding sticky movement” to the point of perfecting the subtlety of seeing and hearing.

 24 An Explanation of the Spiritual and Martial in Tai Chi 

 If the essence of material substances lies in their phenomenological reality, then the presence of the ontological status of abstract objects shall become clear in the final culmination of the energy that is derived from oneness and the Real. How can man learn this truth? By truly seeking that which is the shadow of philosophy and the charge of all living substances, that of the nature of the divine.

See also 
Zhuang Zhou
I Ching
Lao Tzu
Neijia
Neo-Confucianism
T'ai chi classics
Silk reeling
Tao Yin

References 

Tai chi
Eastern philosophy